Nick Danziger HonFRPS CF (born 22 April 1958) is a British photographer, film maker and travel writer.

Early life
Danziger was born in Marylebone, London but grew up in Monaco and Switzerland.

Work
In 1982 he received a Churchill Fellowship which enabled him to spend 18 months on the ancient Silk Route from Turkey to China, disguised as a local traveller, taking photographs which resulted in his book Danziger's Travels. Danziger has since travelled the world taking photographs and making documentary films. Most of his work is based on people living in difficult circumstances, particularly young people. His photographs have appeared in newspapers and magazines worldwide, toured museums and galleries internationally, and are held in numerous museum collections. 

For The British, Danziger created a photographic documentary in black-and-white images. From the halls of Westminster to inner-city communities beset by crime and unemployment, the exhibition depicted both the traditions and reality of life in Great Britain in the 1990s for a range of social classes.

Through individual and personal stories, Behind the Headlines – Afghan Lives investigated a country often in the news but little understood by those outside its borders. For Revisited, in 2010 he retraced his steps from 2005 to find out what has happened to the women and children he met.

Eleven Women Facing War tells eleven stories of women from Afghanistan, Sierra Leone, Colombia, the Balkans, Israel and the Palestinian Territories. Danziger initially photographed these women in conflict zones for an International Committee of the Red Cross study in 2001. Ten years later, he set out to find each one to learn what had become of their lives. 

In 2000, the United Nations' eight Millennium Development Goals were put in place to achieve universal primary education, reduce child mortality and improve maternal health. Danziger travelled to eight of the world's poorest countries and met individuals living in extreme poverty. Through the stories of 40 men, women and children he sought to document the progress being made towards meeting the eight goals.

For Blair at War, in March 2003 Danziger and Peter Stothard began a 30-day study of a Prime Minister at war, with access to Tony Blair's "inner circle" as he confronted an angry nation and deployed British forces against Iraq.

Mana was made inside the sacred space of an All Blacks camp—revealing the highs and lows of New Zealand's iconic rugby team.

Danziger appeared on BBC Radio 4's Desert Island Discs on 16 March 2003.

Publications
Danziger's Travels: Beyond Forbidden Frontiers. Reissued. 1993 .
Danziger's Adventures: From Miami to Kabul. Reissued. 2009. .
Missing Lives. Stockport: Dewi Lewis, 2010. .
Danziger's Britain: A Journey to the Edge. New edition. 2011. .
Onze Femmes Face à la Guerre = Eleven Women Facing War. Lieux Dits, 2011. .
Mana. Hodder Mao / Hachette NZ, 2010. .

Awards
2007: Honorary Fellowship of The Royal Photographic Society

Exhibitions
Blair at War
 National Portrait Gallery, London, 2001
 Canadian War Museum, Ottawa, Ontario, Canada, 2008
 Simon Fraser University, Teck Gallery, Vancouver, British Columbia, Canada, 2008/09
 London Gallery West, University of Westminster, London, 2010
Eight-Millennium Development Goals
 County Hall, London, 2005
 National Library, Singapore, 2006
 The Photographic Society of Singapore, Singapore, 2006
 Wat Phnom Exhibition Centre, Phnom Penh, Cambodia, 2006
 Foreign Correspondents' Club of Thailand, Bangkok, Thailand, 2006
 Foreign Correspondents' Club of South Asia, Delhi, India, 2006
 Monasterio San Nicolo, Lido, Venice, Italy, 2007
 Embassy of the United Kingdom, Budapest, Budapest, Hungary, 2008
 International Business School, Budapest, Hungary, 2008
 Centre Culturel Alban Minville, Toulouse, France, 2009
Behind the Headlines – Afghan Lives
 Host Gallery, London, 2006
 Tron Gallery, Glasgow, 2007
 Canada House, London, 2007
Between Heaven and Earth: A Journey Through Christian Ethiopia
 Royal Geographical Society, London, 2009 
 École Biblique et Archéologique Française de Jérusalem, Jerusalem, 2010   
 A. M. Qattan Foundation, Ramallah, 2010
 The French Cultural Center, Nablus, 2010 
 Dar Annadwa, The International Center of Bethlehem, Bethlehem, 2010 
 Centre Culturel Français Romain Gary de Jérusalem, Jerusalem, 2010 
 National Museum of Ethiopia, Addis Ababa, 2010 
 Lalibela World Cultural Centre, Lalibela, Ethiopia, 2012
Women Facing War, Théâtre de la Photographie et de l'image, Nice, France, 2008/09
The Historic Neighbourhoods and Houses of Herat and Kabul, Afghanistan, Musée des Arts Asiatiques, Nice, France, 2009/10
Missing Lives
 Riverside Walkway', Gabriel's Wharf, London, 2010
 Kalemegdan Fortress, Belgrade, Serbia, 2010
 Trg Djece, Sarajevo, Bosnia-Hercegovina, 2010
 Mother Teresa Square, Pristina, Kosovo, 2010
 Spanski Trg, Mostar, Bosnia-Hercegovina, 2010
 Bana Milosavljevica, Banja Luka, Republika Srbska, 2010
 Trg Strossmayer, Zagreb, Croatia, 2010
 Strasbourg, France, 2010
 Place du Luxembourg, Brussels, Belgium, 2010
 Canadian War Museum, Ottawa, Ontario, Canada, 2011
 Multicultural Hub, Melbourne, 2011
 Waisenhausplatz, Bern, Switzerland, 2011
Guerre et Paix: Femmes dans le XXIeme siecle, Salle d'Exposition du Quai Antoine 1er, Monaco, 2011
Mana, Britomart, Auckland, New Zealand, 2011
Onze Femmes face à la Guerre – Eleven Women Facing War
 Hôtel de Ville, Paris, 2011
 Canadian War Museum, Ottawa, Ontario, Canada, 2013
 Founders' Gallery, The Military Museums, Calgary, Alberta, Canada, 2013
Galerie Ferrero, Nice, France, 2012
Revisited
 Royal Geographical Society, London, 2011/12
 The Brindley, Runcorn, 2013

References

External links

1958 births
Living people
British expatriates in Monaco
Photographers from London